The 2018–19 Oakland Golden Grizzlies men's basketball team represented Oakland University during the 2018–19 NCAA Division I men's basketball season. The Golden Grizzlies, led by 35th-year head coach Greg Kampe, played their home games at the Athletics Center O'rena in Auburn Hills, Michigan as members of the Horizon League. They finished the season 16–17, 11–7 in Horizon League play to finish in third place. They defeated Youngstown State in the quarterfinals of the Horizon League tournament before losing in the semifinals to Northern Kentucky.

Previous season
The Golden Grizzlies finished the 2017–18 season 19–14, 10–8 in Horizon League play to finish in fourth place. They defeated IUPUI in the quarterfinals of the Horizon League tournament before losing in the semifinals to Cleveland State.

Roster

Schedule and results

|-
! colspan=12 style= | Exhibition

|-
! colspan=12 style= | Non-conference regular season

|-
! colspan=12 style= | Horizon League regular season

|-
! colspan=9 style= | Horizon League tournament

Source:

References

External links
 Official site
 Team statistics

Oakland Golden Grizzlies men's basketball seasons
Oakland
Oakland Golden Grizzlies men's basketball
Oakland Golden Grizzlies men's basketball